Morazán is a municipality in the El Progreso Department of Guatemala.

Morazán is situated at 349.5 m above sea level, and covers a terrain of 329 km².
Employment is overgrown now of many opportunities there are in Morazán.  Agriculture is the dominant trade, and much of the population works family-owned fields.  Opportunities for education have now been more available its higher from kindergarten to learning being a teacher. There are many sports to be done. Friendly people and many stored to search around.

One annual festival "Feria del pueblo"is celebrated from December 22 to December 26 each year.

External links
 Morazán Municipality

Municipalities of the El Progreso Department